Africa Wrestling Alliance (AWA), formerly known as Africa Wrestling Federation, is a South African professional wrestling promotion founded in 1995. The regionally based company is owned by Shaun Koen and Koos Rossouw. It is a traditionally styled promotion influenced by the international wrestling market, such as European and American mainstream wrestling. The style encompassed by the promotion's wrestlers is referred to as Rofstoei (an Afrikaans term).

History
The Africa Wrestling Federation (AWF) was founded by Shaun Koen and his wife in 1995 after the death of his father, Jackie Koen, on 16 December 1994. The AWF started off as a regional promotion based in Cape Town, regularly running in the Goodwood and Parow areas. A few years later the AWF started doing tours nationally and also ventured outside of South Africa to tour countries like Swaziland and Zimbabwe.

In 2003 AWF signed a year-long television contract with eTV to air weekly shows in 2004. The series was known as AWF on E Slam Series, and the episodes were recorded in arenas such as the Good Hope Centre, Carnival City and the Coca-Cola Dome. The actual running time of these events lasted three to four hours, but to minimise costs, they were split into one hour for each episode. In late 2004, ratings and attendance started decreasing. A soundtrack CD, AWF on E - The Soundtrack, was released under the EMI label to promote the television show. The year-long season culminated in a two-hour live special held at Sun City on 11 December 2004.

Plans were underway to have a second season in 2005, but AWA and eTV failed to agree to new terms. This caused the promotion to lose ownership of the name Africa Wrestling Federation and forced them to create new trademarks. The Africa Wrestling Alliance (AWA) name was then established in March 2005. Due to the lack of television exposure following AWF on E, some of the top names like The Saint, Skull, Rey Bourne and Jacques Rogue departed AWA to pursue other interests.

Coca-Cola Royal Rumble
The AWA holds an annual Royal Rumble show at the Parow Civic Centre venue (nicknamed The House of Pain) in December. The event is regularly sponsored by Coca-Cola. The last champion was William McQueen, who won the AWA Royal Rumble Championship on 3 December 2007 in the 21-man battle royal main event.

Touring and charity work
Although the AWA is currently a non-televised, regional promotion, it has had a big impact on the South African wrestling industry and frequently does tours beyond its headquarters, having held events in the surrounding areas of Cape Town and in neighbouring countries such as Swaziland, Mozambique and Zimbabwe. The promotion is also actively involved in charity work. In association with its many sponsors and the Reach for a Dream foundation, unprivileged children are provided with the opportunity to attend certain shows for free and meet members of the roster.

Training academy
The AWA training facility is currently based at the Wingfield Army Base in Goodwood, Cape Town. Classes are regularly held every Tuesday and Thursday. The head of the academy is Shaun Koen.

Championships

Active

Inactive

AWA African Cruiserweight Championship

The AWA African Cruiserweight Championship is a professional wrestling cruiserweight championship owned by the AWA promotion. The title was created and debuted on 11 December 2004 at a two-hour live television special, AWF on E Slam Series Final, when Johnny Palazzio won it in a battle royal. Title reigns are determined either by professional wrestling matches between wrestlers involved in pre-existing scripted feuds and storylines, or by scripted circumstances. Wrestlers are portrayed as either villains or heroes as they follow a series of tension-building events, which culminate in a wrestling match or series of matches for the championship. Title changes happen at live events, which are usually released on DVD.

Roster

Heavyweight Division
 BDX-treme
 Bulldog
 Johnny Palazzio
 Just Ted
 Missing Link
 Selfstyled Sammy Swiegers
 Shaun Koen
 The Oz

Cruiserweight Division
 Miss Gorgeous
 Mr Money
 Nitro
 Rashiedi
 Rasta Man
 Vinnie Vegas]
 William McQueen

Lightweight Division
 Ed-Electric
 Hillbilly Kid
 Nick Fury
 Revyv

Other personnel
 Stan Mars (Ring Announcer)
 Billy Daniels (Timekeeper)
 Robert Meyer (Referee)
 Black Mamba (Referee)
 Kenny (Referee)
 Tony "The Hammer" (Referee)
 Leon Venter (Referee)

Alumni

 African Warrior
 Alkatraz
 Archangel
 Big Bad Bruce
 Billy West
 The Bruiser
 Butcher
 The Chad
 Danie Brits
 Dusty Wolfe
 Du Congo
 El Matador
 Geronimo - Majive
 The Great Raj
 Gypsey

 Iron Bone
 Jacques Roque
 Johan Voges
 Leslie van der Westhuizen
 Mr Pain
 Nizaam "the champ" Hartley
 The Protector
 Rollerball Danny
 The Saint
 Skull
 Solid Gold Grant Smith
 Sunny Surf

 Sledgehammer
 Spider Nel
 Terry Middoux
 Tolla the Animal
 Tommy Rich
 Trashman
 Trevor van der Westhuizen
 The Viper
 Vamp
 Warlock
 Wurm Visagie
 X-Hale

References

External links 
 Africa Wrestling Alliance Official Website
 Wrestle Mania takes Cape Town by storm
 Mayhem at the Fresh Air Camp

South African professional wrestling promotions